Gökçekaya can refer to:

 Gökçekaya, Laçin
 Gökçekaya Dam